Eatontown is a borough in Monmouth County, in the U.S. state of New Jersey. As of the 2020 United States census, the borough's population was 13,597, an increase of 888 (7.0%) from the 2010 census count of 12,709, reflecting a decline of 1,299 (−9.3%) from the 14,008 counted in the 2000 census.

What is now Eatontown was originally incorporated as Eatontown Township by an act of the New Jersey Legislature on April 4, 1873, from portions of Ocean Township and Shrewsbury Township. Portions of the township were taken to form West Long Branch (April 7, 1908) and Oceanport (April 6, 1920). Eatontown was reincorporated as a borough on March 8, 1926, replacing Eatontown Township, based on the results of a referendum held on April 13, 1926. The borough was named for Thomas Eaton, an early settler who built a mill .

The United States Army's Fort Monmouth operated in Eatontown from 1917 until its closure in September 2011, based on recommendations from the Base Realignment and Closure Commission. It was home to the United States Army Materiel Command's (AMC) Communication and Electronics Command (CECOM). Fort Monmouth was also home to the United States Military Academy Preparatory School (or USMAPS), which trains approximately 250 students per year to enter as freshmen (plebes) at the United States Military Academy at West Point.

Celebrity chef Bobby Flay previously owned a restaurant in Eatontown.

History

Eatontown's history is documented in the book Eatontown and Fort Monmouth.

In 1670, Thomas Eaton (for which the town is named) surveyed the area and constructed a grist mill in present-day Wampum Lake Park.

From the book Eatontown and Fort Monmouth:

By 1796, a village had developed across from Eaton's mill, with a tannery and general store on the east side of the Red Bank Turnpike [now State Route 35]. A tavern for the New York - Philadelphia stage coach trade was built on what would become the intersection of Main and Broad Streets. A second stage coach stop was established in Mechanicsville on the ocean-bound road. This village would later be called West Long Branch. 

By 1850, Eaton's village had grown to include four stores on Main Street and nearly forty homes. The Eatontown Steamboat Company built docks on Oceanport Creek to ship milled flour and other farm produce up the South Shrewsbury River to markets in New York City. Entrepreneur James P. Allaire built a four-story stone warehouse at the docks, from which he shipped his bog iron forged at the Howell Works 15 miles away. 

In 1886, a mob broke into the jail and removed a black man, Samuel "Mingo Jack" Johnson, who was being held for the alleged rape of a white woman. The mob brutally beat and then hanged Johnson, the father of five. Later events show that it was extremely unlikely that Johnson was guilty of the crime. In 2012, mayor Gerald Tarantolo issued a public apology for the failure of security at the jail.

In 2020, Eatontown was to celebrate its 350th anniversary, but most of the activities were delayed due to COVID-19 concerns.

Geography
According to the United States Census Bureau, the borough had a total area of 5.89 square miles (15.26 km2), including 5.84 square miles (15.13 km2) of land and 0.05 square miles (0.13 km2) of water (0.87%).

The Unincorporated community of Locust Grove is located within the borough.

The borough borders the Monmouth County municipalities of Shrewsbury borough on the north, Oceanport to the northeast, West Long Branch to the east, Ocean Township to the south and Tinton Falls to the west.

Demographics

Census 2010

The Census Bureau's 2006–2010 American Community Survey showed that (in 2010 inflation-adjusted dollars) median household income was $60,188 (with a margin of error of +/− $8,468) and the median family income was $77,846 (+/− $8,290). Males had a median income of $56,086 (+/− $7,155) versus $43,750 (+/− $5,817) for females. The per capita income for the borough was $35,200 (+/− $2,933). About 6.4% of families and 9.1% of the population were below the poverty line, including 12.7% of those under age 18 and 5.4% of those age 65 or over.

Census 2000
As of the 2000 United States census there were 14,008 people, 5,780 households, and 3,444 families residing in the borough. The population density was 2,366.8 people per square mile (913.6/km2). There were 6,341 housing units at an average density of 1,071.4 per square mile (413.6/km2). The racial makeup of the borough was 73.29% White, 11.61% African American, 0.34% Native American, 9.32% Asian, 0.04% Pacific Islander, 2.31% from other races, and 3.10% from two or more races. Hispanic or Latino of any race were 6.62% of the population.

There were 5,780 households, out of which 28.7% had children under the age of 18 living with them, 46.8% were married couples living together, 9.9% had a female householder with no husband present, and 40.4% were non-families. 33.8% of all households were made up of individuals, and 10.0% had someone living alone who was 65 years of age or older. The average household size was 2.35 and the average family size was 3.08.

In the borough the population was spread out, with 22.9% under the age of 18, 7.0% from 18 to 24, 35.0% from 25 to 44, 21.7% from 45 to 64, and 13.3% who were 65 years of age or older. The median age was 37 years. For every 100 females, there were 94.7 males. For every 100 females age 18 and over, there were 91.2 males.

The median income for a household in the borough was $53,833, and the median income for a family was $69,397. Males had a median income of $49,508 versus $35,109 for females. The per capita income for the borough was $26,965. About 3.5% of families and 5.7% of the population were below the poverty line, including 4.3% of those under age 18 and 9.2% of those age 65 or over.

Government

Local government
Eatontown is governed under the Borough form of New Jersey municipal government, one of 218 municipalities (of the 564) statewide that use this form, the most commonly used form of government in the state. The governing body is comprised of the Mayor and the Borough Council, with all positions elected at-large on a partisan basis as part of the November general election. The Mayor is elected directly by the voters to a four-year term of office. The Borough Council is comprised of six members elected to serve three-year terms on a staggered basis, with two seats coming up for election each year in a three-year cycle. The Borough form of government used by Eatontown is a "weak mayor / strong council" government in which council members act as the legislative body with the mayor presiding at meetings and voting only in the event of a tie. The mayor can veto ordinances subject to an override by a two-thirds majority vote of the council. The mayor makes committee and liaison assignments for council members, and most appointments are made by the mayor with the advice and consent of the council.

, the Mayor of Eatontown is Independent Anthony Talerico Jr., whose term of office ends on December 31, 2022. Members of the Borough Council are Maria Grazia Escalante (R, 2022), David Gindi (R, 2024), Kevin L. Gonzalez (R, 2022), Danielle M. Jones (D, 2023), Everett D. Lucas (R, 2024) and Mark Regan Jr. (R, 2023).

In January 2019, Democrat Tonya Rivera was selected from a list of three candidates nominated by the Eatontown Democratic committee to fill the seat expiring in December 2020 that had been held by Bridget Harris until she resigned from office the previous month; Rivera served until the November 2019 general election, when voters chose a candidate to fill the balance of the term of office. In April 2019, the Democratic municipal committee selected Gregory Loxton to fill the seat expiring in December 2021 that had been held by Lisa Murphy until she resigned from office in March 2019; Loxton also served until the November 2019 general election, when voters chose a candidate to fill the balance of the term of office. In the November 2019 general election, Republicans were elected to fill the two full three-year terms, a single two-year unexpired term (Joseph Olsavsky) and two one-year unexpired terms (Edwin Palenzuela and Mark Regan). The three members elected to unexpired terms took office in November after the results were certified; Palenzuela stepped down from office in December and was repelaced in January 2020 by Hope Corcoran.

Federal and state representation
Eatontown is located in New Jersey's 4th congressional district and is part of New Jersey's 11th state legislative district.

Politics
As of March 23, 2011, there was a total of 7,669 registered voters in Eatontown, of whom 2,037 (26.6%) were registered as Democrats, 1,490 (19.4%) were registered as Republicans and 4,140 (54.0%) were registered as Unaffiliated. There were 2 voters registered as Libertarians or Greens.

In the 2012 presidential election, Democrat Barack Obama received 54.4% of the vote (2,887 cast), ahead of Republican Mitt Romney with 44.2% (2,344 votes), and other candidates with 1.4% (74 votes), among the 5,349 ballots cast by the borough's 8,184 registered voters (44 ballots were spoiled), for a turnout of 65.4%. In the 2013 gubernatorial election, Republican Chris Christie received 66.8% of the vote (2,038 cast), ahead of Democrat Barbara Buono with 31.7% (966 votes), and other candidates with 1.5% (46 votes), among the 3,089 ballots cast by the borough's 8,281 registered voters (39 ballots were spoiled), for a turnout of 37.3%.

In 2022 New Jersey Governor Phil Murphy successfully wooed Netflix to buy the empty 292 acre Monmouth Army base. Netflix planned to open a "state-of-the-art" East Coast production facility, transforming a property that had been largely vacant for more than a decade into an economic engine of film production in New Jersey.

Education
Students in public school for pre-kindergarten through eighth grade attend the Eatontown Public Schools. As of the 2018–19 school year, the district, comprised of four schools, had an enrollment of 962 students and 101.5 classroom teachers (on an FTE basis), for a student–teacher ratio of 9.5:1. Schools in the district (with 2018–2019 enrollment data from the National Center for Education Statistics) are 
Meadowbrook Elementary School with 292 students in grades K–2), 
Woodmere Elementary School with 232 students in grades Pre-K and 3–4, 
Margaret L. Vetter Elementary School with 199 students in grades 5–6 and 
Memorial Middle School with 220 students in grades 7 and 8.

Public school students in ninth through twelfth grades attend Monmouth Regional High School, located in Tinton Falls. The high school is part of the Monmouth Regional High School District, which also serves students from Shrewsbury Township and Tinton Falls, along with students from Naval Weapons Station Earle. As of the 2018–19 school year, the high school had an enrollment of 972 students and 91.0 classroom teachers (on an FTE basis), for a student–teacher ratio of 10.7:1. Seats on the nine-member board of education for the high school district are allocated based on the population of the constituent municipalities, with three seats allocated to Eatontown.

Eatontown is also home to Hawkswood School, a school founded in 1976 that serves the educational needs of disabled students in the area "with complex, multiple disabilities, including autism".

Transportation

Roads and highways

Several state highways pass through Eatontown. These include the freeway portion of Route 18 in the southwestern part of the borough, Route 35 and Route 36 in the center of the borough, and Route 71 in the north. Major county roads that pass through Eatontown include CR 537 and CR 547.

The Garden State Parkway, the largest highway in Monmouth County, is accessible just outside the borough in neighboring Tinton Falls at exit 105.

Public transportation
NJ Transit provides local bus transportation on the 831 and 832 routes.

Complete Streets 
Created in May 2018, the goal of the Eatontown Complete Streets Advisory Committee is to establish a walkable and bikeable community that is safe and accessible for people of all ages and abilities.

Notable people

People who were born in, residents of, or otherwise closely associated with Eatontown include:

 Preet Bharara (born 1968), former United States Attorney for the Southern District of New York
 Charles W. Billings (1866–1928), politician and competitive shooter who was a member of the 1912 Summer Olympics American trapshooting team that won the gold medal in team clay pigeons
 Joe Bravo (born 1971), thoroughbred horse racing jockey
 Herman Edwards (born 1954), football analyst and former NFL head coach
 June Elvidge (1893–1965), film actress
 Houston Fields (1861–1899), sheriff of Monmouth County
 Liati Mayk-Hai (born 1981) singer-songwriter, visual artist, poet and athlete
 Samuel "Mingo Jack" Johnson (1820–1886), former slave, jockey and lynching victim
 Melissa Reeves (born 1967), actress who has played the role of Jennifer Horton on Days of Our Lives since 1985
 Kevin Ritz (born 1965), former MLB pitcher who played for the Detroit Tigers and Colorado Rockies
 Cindy Lee Van Dover (born 1954), oceanographer, who also studies biodiversity, biogeochemistry, conservation biology, ecology and marine science
 Anthony M. Villane (1929–2022), dentist and politician, who served in the New Jersey General Assembly from 1976 to 1988
 Peter Vredenburgh Jr. (1837–1864), lawyer and Union Army major

References

External links

 Borough of Eatontown official website
 Eatontown Public Schools
 Eatontown Police
 
 Data for Eatontown Public Schools, National Center for Education Statistics
 Monmouth Regional High School District

 
1873 establishments in New Jersey
Borough form of New Jersey government
Boroughs in Monmouth County, New Jersey
Populated places established in 1873